The 1998 Enfield Council election took place on 7 May 1998 to elect members of Enfield London Borough Council in London, England. The whole council was up for election and the Labour party stayed in overall control of the council. This was the first time that Labour were re-elected for a second term in Enfield. They later won a historic third term in 2018 after winning again in Enfield in 2010 and 2014.

Election result
At the same as the election Enfield saw 67.2% vote in favour of the 1998 Greater London Authority referendum and 32.8% against, on a 32.8% turnout. Overall turnout at the election was 33.26%.

Ward results

References

1998 London Borough council elections
1998